Cheung Man-kwong (born 15 September 1954) is a Hong Kong politician, who is a member of the Yuen Long District Council.

Background
Born in Hong Kong with family roots in Taishan, Cheung was a member of the Hong Kong Legislative Council representing the Education functional constituency. He is a member of Democratic Party and former chairman of Hong Kong Professional Teachers' Union. He obtained his bachelor's degree from the Economics department of the Chinese University of Hong Kong and is a registered teacher.

Views, policy positions and Legco voting
In June 2010, he voted with the party in favour of the government's 2012 constitutional reform package, which included the late amendment by the Democratic Party – accepted by the Beijing government – to hold a popular vote for five new District Council functional constituencies.

References

External links
Hong Kong Legislative Council's website on Cheung Man Kwong
Cheung Man Kwong's website
Hong Kong Professional Teachers' Union's website

Cheung, Man Kwong
Cheung, Man Kwong
Charter 08 signatories
Democratic Party (Hong Kong) politicians
United Democrats of Hong Kong politicians
Alumni of the Chinese University of Hong Kong
Hong Kong educators
HK LegCo Members 1991–1995
HK LegCo Members 1995–1997
HK LegCo Members 1998–2000
HK LegCo Members 2000–2004
HK LegCo Members 2004–2008
HK LegCo Members 2008–2012
Members of the Election Committee of Hong Kong, 2017–2021